Scrap MTV is a program of MTV Brasil, daily for the young audience. Headed by VJ Mariana de Souza (MariMoon), with guests in the studio, pictures, materials and participation of the hearing by telephone and via the web through email. The subjects are more varied, talk about music, fashion, internet, video games and the world pop. Premiered on television on 28 January 2008 with duration of 15 minutes. Currently the program is directed Bettina Hanna, production and Julia Nogueira.

References

External links
 Official website 
 Blog of the MariMoon 

MTV, Scrap
MTV original programming
2000s Brazilian television series
2010s Brazilian television series